Walter Lantz (April 27, 1899 – March 22, 1994) was an American cartoonist, animator, producer and director best known for founding Walter Lantz Productions and creating Woody Woodpecker.

Biography

Early years and start in animation

Lantz was born in New Rochelle, New York, to Italian immigrant parents Francesco Paolo Lantz (formerly Lanza) from Castiglione, Cosentino, Italy and Maria Gervasi (changed to Jarvis to avoid prejudice) from Calitri. Walter's father ran a grocery. His mother, Maria, died while giving birth to Walter's younger brother, Michael Lantz. Walter's father, Francesco, soon  became physically incapacitated leaving Walter to run the grocery store at a young age.  According to Joe Adamson's biography The Walter Lantz Story, Lantz's father was given his new surname by an immigration official who anglicized it. Walter Lantz was always interested in art, completing a mail-order drawing class at age 12. He was inspired when he saw Winsor McCay's animated short "Gertie the Dinosaur".
    
While working as an auto mechanic, Lantz got his first break. Wealthy customer Fred Kafka liked his drawings on the garage's bulletin board and financed Lantz's studies at the Art Students League of New York. Kafka also helped him land a job as a copy boy at the New York American, owned by William Randolph Hearst. Lantz worked at the newspaper and attended art school at night.

By the age of 16, Lantz was working in the animation department of International Film Service studio under director Gregory La Cava. Lantz then worked at the John R. Bray Studios on the Jerry on the Job series. In 1924, Lantz directed, animated and even starred in his first cartoon series "Dinky Doodle", which included the popular fairy tale animated shorts Cinderella (1925) and Little Red Riding Hood (1925). Lantz soon replaced George "Vernon" Stallings as head of production at Bray in 1924. At the urging of his friend Robert G. Vignola, Lantz moved to Hollywood, California, after Bray switched to a publicity film studio in 1927, where he attempted to set up his own cartoon studio with Pinto Colvig, but their sound cartoons never got produced. In the meantime, he worked briefly for director Frank Capra and was a gag writer for Mack Sennett comedies. He also resorted to odd jobs, one of them being a chauffeur.

The Oswald era
In 1928, Lantz was hired by Charles B. Mintz as director on the Oswald the Lucky Rabbit cartoon series for Universal Pictures. Earlier that year, Mintz and his brother-in-law George Winkler had succeeded in getting several animators from the Walt Disney Studio to work for their own studio instead. Universal president Carl Laemmle grew dissatisfied with the Mintz-Winkler product and fired them, deciding instead to produce the Oswalds on the Universal lot. While schmoozing with Laemmle, Lantz wagered that if he could beat Laemmle in a game of poker, the character would be his. As fate would have it, Lantz won the bet and Oswald was now his character.

Lantz inherited many of his initial staff, including animator Tom Palmer and musician Bert Fiske from the Winkler studio, but importantly he chose fellow New York animator Bill Nolan to help develop the series. Nolan's previous credentials included inventing the panorama background and developing a new, streamlined "Felix the Cat". Nolan was (and still is) best known for perfecting the "rubber hose" style of animation. In September 1929, Lantz released his first cartoon, "Race Riot".

The character went to Lantz's operation in 1933.

By 1935, he parted company with Nolan. Lantz became an independent producer, supplying cartoons to Universal instead of merely overseeing the animation department. By 1940, he was negotiating ownership for the characters with whom he had been working.

The Woody Woodpecker era
When Oswald had worn out his welcome, Lantz needed a new character. Meany, Miny and Moe (three ne'er-do-well chimps), Baby-Face Mouse, Snuffy Skunk, Doxie (a comic dachshund), and Jock and Jill (monkeys that resembled Warner Brothers' Bosko) were some personalities Lantz and his staff came up with. However, one character, Andy Panda, stood out and soon became Lantz's headline star for the 1939–1940 production season.

The woodpecker himself, Woody Woodpecker, made his first appearance in an Andy Panda short entitled Knock Knock on November 25, 1940. Less than a year later on August 29, 1941, Lantz married actress Grace Stafford in Reno, Nevada (he was previously married to and had a child with Doris Hollister). According to Lantz himself, he came up with the character during his honeymoon at a ranch nearby. He and Stafford kept hearing a woodpecker incessantly pecking on their roof. Grace suggested that Walter used the bird for inspiration as a cartoon character. Taking her advice, though a bit skeptical, Lantz created the brash woodpecker character, similar to the early Daffy Duck. Woody Woodpecker became an instant hit and got his own series during 1941.

Lantz claimed that Alex Lovy created the original design for Woody, although many animators at the studio agreed that Ben Hardaway, who liked screwball characters (with him creating the preliminary version of Bugs Bunny), drew the original design. Hardaway showed a prototype drawing of Woody to Blanc, asking what he thought of it, to which he jokingly responded "Ugliest damn thing I ever saw".

Mel Blanc supplied Woody's voice for the first three cartoons. When Blanc accepted a full-time contract with Warner Bros., he was replaced as Woody's voice by Danny Webb, who would only voice the character in Pantry Panic before Webb himself was replaced by Kent Rogers.  After Rogers went into the service due to World War II, Dick Nelson voiced Woody in 1943's Ration Bored before gagman Ben Hardaway, the man who was the main force behind Knock Knock, became the bird's voice. Despite this, Blanc's distinctive laugh was still used throughout the cartoons until 1951.

In 1948, the Lantz studio created a hit Academy Award-nominated song titled "The Woody Woodpecker Song", featuring Blanc's laugh. The song was featured in the film Wet Blanket Policy. Mel Blanc sued Lantz for half a million dollars, claiming that Lantz had used his voice in later cartoons without permission. The judge, however, ruled for Lantz, saying that Blanc had failed to copyright his voice or his contributions. Though Lantz won the case, he paid Blanc in an out-of-court settlement when Blanc filed an appeal, and Lantz went in search for a new voice for Woody Woodpecker.

In 1950, Lantz held anonymous auditions. Grace, Lantz's wife, offered to do Woody's voice; however, Lantz turned her down because Woody was a male character. Not discouraged in the least, Grace made her own anonymous audition tape and submitted it to the studio. Not knowing who was behind the voice he heard, Lantz picked Grace's voice for Woody Woodpecker. Grace supplied Woody's voice until the end of production in 1972 and also performed in non-Woody cartoons. At first, Grace voiced Woody without screen credit, thinking that it would disappoint child viewers to know that Woody Woodpecker was voiced by a woman. However, she soon came to enjoy being known as the voice of Woody Woodpecker, and, starting with 1958's Misguided Missile, allowed her name to be credited on the screen. Her version of Woody was cuter and friendlier than the manic Woody of the 1940s, and Lantz's artists redesigned the character to suit the new personality.

Lantz's harmonious relationship with Universal, the studio releasing his cartoons, was jarred when new ownership transformed the company into Universal-International and did away with many of Universal's company policies. The new management insisted on owning licensing and merchandising rights to Lantz's characters. Lantz refused and withdrew from the parent company by the end of 1947, releasing 12 cartoons independently through United Artists in 1948 into the beginning of 1949. Financial difficulties forced Lantz to shut down his studio in 1949. Universal-International re-released Lantz's UA (and several earlier) cartoons during the shutdown and eventually came to terms with Lantz who resumed production in 1951. From this point forward, Lantz worked faster and cheaper, no longer using the lush, artistic backgrounds and stylings that had distinguished his 1940s work.

Lantz used his TV appearances on The Woody Woodpecker Show (which began in 1957) to demonstrate the animation process. Later, Lantz entertained the troops during the Vietnam War and visited hospitalized veterans. Walter Lantz was a good friend of movie innovator George Pal.

Retirement and death

By the 1960s, other movie studios had discontinued their animation departments, leaving Lantz as one of two producers still making cartoons for theaters (the other studio was DePatie-Freleng Enterprises). Lantz finally closed his studio's doors for good in 1972, because by then, he explained, it was economically impossible to continue producing them and stay in business as rising inflation had strained his profits, and Universal serviced the remaining demand with reissues of his older cartoons.

In retirement, Lantz continued to manage his properties by licensing them to media. He continued to draw and paint, selling his paintings of Woody Woodpecker rapidly. On top of that, he worked with Little League and other youth groups in his area. In 1982, Lantz donated 17 artifacts to the Smithsonian Institution's National Museum of American History, among them a wooden model of Woody Woodpecker from the cartoon character's debut in 1941. The Lantzes also made time to visit hospitals and other institutions where Walter would draw Woody and Grace would do the Woody laugh for patients.

During the 1980s and 1990s, Lantz served on the advisory board of the National Student Film Institute.

In 1990, Woody Woodpecker was honored with a star on the Hollywood Walk of Fame. In 1993, Lantz established a $10,000 scholarship and prize for animators in his name at California Institute of the Arts in Valencia, Santa Clarita.

Lantz died at St. Joseph Medical Center in Burbank, California from heart failure on March 22, 1994, at age 94.

Characters
Some characters in the Walter Lantz cartoons (both cartoons and comics) are Oswald the Lucky Rabbit (formerly), Andy Panda, The Beary Family, Maggie & Sam, Maw and Paw, Space Mouse, Woody Woodpecker, Inspector Willoughby, Homer Pigeon, Chilly Willy, Lil' Eightball, Charlie Chicken, Cartune, Wally Walrus, and many more.

Awards
 In 1959, Lantz was honored by the Los Angeles City Council as "one of America's most outstanding animated film cartoonists".
 In 1970, Lantz received the Golden Plate Award of the American Academy of Achievement.
 In 1973, the international animation society, ASIFA/Hollywood, presented him with its Annie Award.
 In 1979, he was given a special Academy Award "for bringing joy and laughter to every part of the world through his unique animated motion pictures", being the second animator to receive this award (the first was Walt Disney, who received it three times, while Chuck Jones was in 1995 the third to receive the merit).
 In 1986, he received a star on the Hollywood Walk of Fame.

See also
 The Golden Age of American animation
 The Fantasy Film Worlds of George Pal (1985) (produced and directed by Arnold Leibovit) – a documentary about George Pal in which Lantz appeared as himself.
 Walter Lantz Productions

References

Further reading
 The Walter Lantz Story with Woody Woodpecker and Friends by Joe Adamson (1985)

External links
 Walter Lantz Productions Collection..1940–1960. UCLA. Performing Arts Special Collections.
 The Walter Lantz Cartune Encyclopedia
 Walter Lantz at Don Markstein's Toonopedia
 The Walter Lantz Studio at Don Markstein's Toonopedia
 Walter Lantz biography on Lambiek
 
 

 
1899 births
1994 deaths
Animators from New York (state)
American cartoonists
American animated film directors
American animated film producers
Annie Award winners
American people of Italian descent
People from Greater Los Angeles
Burials at Forest Lawn Memorial Park (Hollywood Hills)
Artists from New Rochelle, New York
Academy Honorary Award recipients
Bray Productions people
NBCUniversal people
Walter Lantz Productions people